James Sheahan Catholic High School is an independent Roman Catholic co-educational secondary day school, located in Orange, New South Wales, Australia. It is located on Anson Street in Orange next to the train line and is adjacent to the Orange Christian School. It is the largest Catholic school in the Bathurst Diocese.

History
The school was founded in 1980 and was named after Monsignor James Sheahan, a Catholic priest who served in Orange for nearly 50 years. The school was formed by the merger of  Santa Maria College, a girls' school, and  De La Salle College, a boys' school.

Notable alumni
Freya Blackwoodillustrator and special effects artist
Darren Britt former NRL player
Daniel Mortimer former NRL player

See also

 Catholic education in Australia 
 List of Catholic schools in New South Wales

References 

Catholic secondary schools in New South Wales
1980 establishments in Australia
City of Orange
Educational institutions established in 1980
Lasallian schools in Australia